This article lists the squads for the 2020 COSAFA Women's Championship, the 8th edition of the COSAFA Women's Championship. The tournament is a women's international football tournament for national teams organised by COSAFA, teams from Southern Africa, and was held in Nelson Mandela Bay from 3 to 14 November 2020. In the tournament were involved ten national teams: nine teams from COSAFA and Tanzania, who were invited as guests. Each national team registered a squad of 20 players.

The age listed for each player is on 3 November 2020, the first day of the tournament. The numbers of caps and goals listed for each player do not include any matches played after the start of tournament. The club listed is the club for which the player last played a competitive match prior to the tournament. The nationality for each club reflects the national association (not the league) to which the club is affiliated. A flag is included for coaches that are of a different nationality than their own national team.

Group A

Angola
Coach: Lurdes Lutonda

The final squad was announced on 23 October 2020.

Comoros
Coach: Choudjay Mahandhi

The final squad was announced on 30 October 2020.

Eswatini
Coach: Christian Thwala

The final squad was announced on 31 October 2020.

South Africa
Coach: Desiree Ellis

A provisional 27-woman squad was announced on 15 October 2020. The final squad was announced on 28 October 2020.

Group B

Lesotho
Coach: Lehloenya Nkhasi

The final squad was announced on 28 October 2020. On 30 October 2020, Litšeoane Maloro was ruled out due to an ankle injury and was replaced by Maseeiso Mphubelu.

Malawi
Coach: McNelbert Kazuwa

A provisional squad was announced on 24 October 2020. The final squad was announced on 3 November 2020.

Zambia
Coach: Bruce Mwape

A 28-woman provisional squad was announced on 25 September 2020. The final squad was announced on 1 November 2020.

Group C

Botswana
Coach: Gaoletlhoo Nkutlusang

A provisional squad was announced on 16 October 2020. The final squad was selected prior to the tournament.

Tanzania
Coach: Bakari Shime

A provisional squad was announced on 16 October 2020.

Zimbabwe
Coach: Sithethelelwe Sibanda

The final squad was announced on 2 November 2020.

Player representation
Statistics are per the beginning of the competition.

By club
Clubs with 5 or more players represented are listed.

By club nationality

By club federation

By representatives of domestic league

References

2020